Peter Urban (born 14 April 1948 in Bramsche, Lower Saxony) is a German musician and radio host.

Urban has been the German commentator for the Eurovision Song Contest since 1997, following Jan Hofer. Due to illness in 2009, he was unable to commentate on the 2009 Contest, with Tim Frühling filling in, but he returned to commentate in 2010. Urban has also commentated on the Eurovision Dance Contest since 2007.

Currently he hosts the radio programmes "NDR-Info-Nachtclub" and "NDR-2-Soundcheck Neue Musik" for the German regional broadcaster Norddeutscher Rundfunk (NDR), and has been described as the "voice of the station".

References

1948 births
Living people
People from Bramsche
German journalists
German male journalists
German radio personalities
German television presenters
Germany in the Eurovision Song Contest
Eurovision commentators